Gellner is a Jewish surname, that may refer to:

Ernest Gellner (1925–1995), British philosopher
František Gellner (1881–1914), Czech writer
Julius Gellner (1899–1983), Austrian theatre director

See also
8222 Gellner, an asteroid

German-language surnames
Jewish surnames
Yiddish-language surnames